Amit Prakash Sharma (born April 12, 1968) is an Indian parasitologist and Director of National Institute of Malaria Research, New Delhi. He is known for his studies on the disease of malaria and is an elected fellow of the Indian Academy of Sciences , Indian National Science Academy, The World Academy of Sciences and the National Academy of Sciences, India. He has been awarded the Shanti Swarup Bhatnagar Award in Biological Sciences, JC Bose Fellowship, Ranbaxy Science Research Award, Infosys Science Award in Biological Sciences, Om Prakash Bhasin Award in Biological Sciences and Lakshmipat Singhania- IIM Lucknow National Leadership Award.

Biography 
Amit Sharma was born on April 12, 1968, in West Lafayette, Indiana, U.S. He grew up in New Delhi and attended Delhi Public School, Mathura Road. Later, he went to U.S. for his undergraduate studies to Purdue University, did his master's and PhD at Northwestern University in protein crystallography in 1995. Sharma went on to do his post-doctoral work at St. John's College, Oxford and also served as faculty till 2000. On his return to India in 2004, he joined International Centre for Genetic Engineering and Biotechnology as a staff scientist. Since 2019, Sharma has assumed the post of Director of National Institute of Malaria Research in New Delhi.

Legacy 

Sharma's research is focused in the field of structural parasitology, and he has carried out advanced research in malaria parasite biology. He led the ICGEB group of scientists who collaborated with the researchers from the Broad Institute who discovered a new compound, bicyclic azetidine, which showed potential against the Plasmodium parasite that caused malaria. His studies have been documented by way of a number of articles. PublicationsList, an online repository of scientific articles, has listed several of them. 
Sharma has delivered keynote or invited speeches at many conferences and sits on the editorial board of Proceedings of the National Academy of Sciences, India for Section B - Biological Sciences.

Awards and honors 
The Department of Biotechnology of the Government of India awarded Sharma the National Bioscience Award for Career Development, one of the highest Indian science awards, in 2007. He received the Goyal Prize in 2009. In 2011, Sharma was awarded the Shanti Swarup Bhatnagar Prize for Science and Technology, the highest science award in India, in the biological sciences category, He was selected for the Infosys Prize in 2015 for his contribution to life sciences.

The 2015 RCSB PDB Poster Prize of the Asian Crystallographic Association was secured by Vitul Jain for his poster, based on an article, Structure of Prolyl-tRNA Synthetase-Halofuginone Complex Provides Basis for Development of Drugs against Malaria and Toxoplasmosis. which he co-wrote with Sharma.

The National Academy of Sciences, India elected Sharma as a fellow in 2006 and he received the elected fellowship of the Indian Academy of Sciences in 2012.

References

External links 
 
 

Living people
1968 births
20th-century Indian biologists
Recipients of the Shanti Swarup Bhatnagar Award in Biological Science
Indian parasitologists
Purdue University alumni
Alumni of the University of Oxford
Northwestern University alumni
N-BIOS Prize recipients
Indian scientific authors